Sons of Koop is the debut studio album by Swedish electronic jazz group Koop. It was released on July 21, 1997 via Super Records

Track listing
 "Introduktion"  – 1:46
 "Glömd"  – 4:50
 "Psalm"  – 4:37
 "Bjarne Riis"  – 2:43
 "Absolute Space"  – 5:05
 "Words of Tranquility"  – 5:13
 "Salvation"  – 5:04
 "Jellyfishes"  – 6:51
 "Once Britten"  – 4:06
 "Hellsbells"  – 4:03

Credits
Artwork by (cover) – Acne & Bisse
Mastered by – Kaj Erixon
Mixed by – Kaj Erixon, Koop
Written by, producer – Koop

References

1997 debut albums
Koop (band) albums